Cathedral Bluffs is a hamlet in Saskatchewan.

Organized hamlets in Saskatchewan